Zaviyeh Hamudi (also Romanized as Zāvīyeh Ḩamūdī, Zavīyeh Hamoodī, and Zāveyeh-ye Ḩamūdī; also known as Hamūdī and Zavīyeh) is a village in Qeblehi Rural District, in the Central District of Dezful County, Khuzestan Province, Iran. At the 2006 census, its population was 523, in 107 families.

References 

Populated places in Dezful County